The American College of Rheumatology (ACR; until 1985 called American Rheumatism Association) is an organization of and for physicians, health professionals, and scientists that advances rheumatology through programs of education, research, advocacy and practice support relating to the care of people with arthritis and rheumatic and musculoskeletal diseases.

It organizes scientific meetings, publishes three medical journals (Arthritis & Rheumatology, Arthritis Care & Research, and ACR Open Rheumatology), and promotes (through the Research and Education Foundation) research into rheumatological conditions, including the formulation of diagnostic criteria for diseases. Its division, the Association of Rheumatology Health Professionals, represents non-physician health care professionals in the field.

See also
ACR score for rheumatoid arthritis

References

External links
 Official site
 ACR Research and Education Foundation

Rheumatology organizations
Medical associations based in the United States
Medical and health organizations based in Georgia (U.S. state)